Səliva or Səlivə (often transliterated Saliva) is a village in the Astara Rayon of Azerbaijan.  The village forms part of the municipality of Deqadi.

References 

Populated places in Astara District